The Hawke's Bay Hawks are a New Zealand basketball team based in Napier. The Hawks compete in the National Basketball League (NBL) and play their home games at Pettigrew Green Arena. For sponsorship reasons, they are known as the Taylor Hawks.

Team history
The Hawke's Bay Hawks, then known as the Napier Sunhawks, started in the second-tiered Conference Basketball League (CBL). After winning the CBL Invitation championship in 1982, the team was promoted to the National Basketball League (NBL) for the 1983 season. They made the semi-finals in 1983, before going on a nine-year playoff hiatus. The Hawks made the semi-finals every year between 1993 and 1997, including playing in their first NBL championship series in 1995, where they lost 2–0 to the Auckland Stars.

In 1998, the Hawks finished tenth in the 11-team competition. They subsequently withdrew from the NBL and joined the CBL for the 1999 season. After finishing as CBL runners-up in 1999, the Hawks returned to the NBL in 2000.

In 2004, the Hawks made their first NBL playoff appearance since 1997. They went on to reach the championship round three years in a row between 2005 and 2007, which included them winning their maiden NBL championship in 2006 with an 84–69 victory over the Auckland Stars in the final. The Hawks continued to play in the post-season every year between 2008 and 2012, including making the final in 2011 and winning their first minor premiership in 2012. After missing the playoffs in 2013, the Hawks' 2014 season saw them win second minor premiership and reach the championship round for the sixth time.

Between 2015 and 2017, the Hawks had a three-year playoff hiatus, including a winless campaign in 2016. They returned to the playoffs in 2018, before reaching the NBL final in 2019, where they lost 78–68 to the Wellington Saints despite leading 59–38 midway through the third quarter.

The Hawks sat out the 2020 season due to the COVID-19 pandemic. They returned in 2021 and reached  their eighth NBL final, where they once again lost to the Wellington Saints.

Honour roll

Source: Hawks NBL Role of Honour

Players

Current roster

Notable past players

 Marco Alexander
 Zack Atkinson
 Kerry Boagni
 Brandon Bowman
 /  Suleiman Braimoh
 /  Willie Burton
 /  Clifton Bush
 Troy Coleman
 Aidan Daly
 Thomas DeMarcus
 Jamie Dixon
 Terry Giles
 Paul Henare
 Darryl Johnson
 Jeremy Kench
 Daniel Kickert
 /  Adrian Majstrovich
 Shaun McCreedy
 Scott McGregor
 Chris Porter
 /  Dion Prewster
 /  Dusty Rychart
 Dustin Scott
 E. J. Singler
 Byron Vaetoe
 Robert Wilson
 Paora Winitana

References

External links
 Official team website
 

Basketball teams established in 1982
1982 establishments in New Zealand
Basketball teams in New Zealand
National Basketball League (New Zealand) teams
Sport in the Hawke's Bay Region